The Minnesota State Knowledge Bowl Meet is an annual, two-day academic quiz competition sponsored by the Minnesota Service Cooperatives, which is Minnesota's governing body of Knowledge Bowl.  The State Meet is held in April at Cragun's Resort in Brainerd.

Format
The 48 teams that qualify for the Minnesota State Knowledge Bowl Meet are ordered by enrollment size and then are evenly divided, with the larger 24 schools in Class AA, and the smaller 24 schools in Class A. All schools from the Metro Region (Region XI) are automatically placed in Class AA. If one private school qualifies, it is automatically placed in Class AA, regardless of size. If two private schools qualify, the larger is placed in Class AA, and the smaller in Class A. If three private schools qualify, the larger two are placed in Class AA, and the smallest is placed in Class A, and so on.

The first day of the State Knowledge Bowl Meet begins in the evening with a banquet, at which all the teams are introduced. Following the banquet is the written round which consists of 60 questions. Once the written rounds are scored, the teams are ranked. In the event of a tie after the written round, certain questions will be used to break the tie. The state meet is "power-ranked," that is, teams are grouped together by their current standing as follows:

Room 1: #1-2-3
Room 2: #4-5-6
Room 3: #7-8-9
Room 4: #10-11-12
Room 5: #13-14-15
Room 6: #16-17-18
Room 7: #19-20-21
Room 8: #22-23-24

Teams are power ranked for five, 45-question oral rounds. At the end, the team with the highest total score is the State Champion. The top 3 teams receive trophies, and the top 6 teams receive medals. If there is a tie among the top 6 following the fifth and final oral round, it is broken by a 15-question "overtime." The Heritage Spirit Award is given to one team from each class that demonstrates a positive attitude and sportsmanship as voted on by the readers, computer operators, coaches, and other teams.

Historical format
In 2007, the State Tournament began using strength-of-scoring, or "SOS". After the last oral rounds, teams receive 1.5 extra points for each round they have competed in the top room, 1 extra point for each round in the second room, and 0.5 extra points for each round in the third room. This was done both to help break ties and to recognize that scoring points is harder in top rooms.

Prior to 2000, there was a "championship round," in which the top three teams (after five oral rounds) competed head-to-head to determine who would be champion.

Furthermore, the state meet was not split into two classes until 1996.

Regarding how the State Tournament ended up in the Brainerd resort area, former Metro ECSU Knowledge Bowl coordinator Marilyn McGowan says "It all hinges on a measles outbreak in Thief River Falls the year the tournament was to be held there and the state health department said we would have to cancel our plans to have it there.  Thus, at the last minute, it was moved to Cragun's.  The original plan was to have each ECSU region host it with it being held throughout the state.  However, it worked so well holding it in a resort without the temptations of a city, that it has been held at a Brainerd lakes resort ever since the episode with the measles outbreak.  We have also been at Madden's and Breezy Point."

The 1984 tournament had five oral rounds like today's, but in 1986 and 1987 only four oral rounds were played (in addition to the written round and championship round). In 1991 and before, oral rounds consisted of 60 questions.  In 1992 the change was made to 45 questions per round.

In 2013, only four oral rounds were used. Due to inclement weather across the state, the Friday schedule was moved back by a couple of hours to allow for late arrivals; the fifth oral round was eliminated to keep the meet more on schedule. This weather caused some schools to not be able to attend at all. Only 21 AA teams attended, instead of the usual 24.

State champions and runners-up

Blanks indicate incomplete records.  A second score by a team name indicates score in championship round (through 1999) or score in tiebreaker round (2000 and after). * denotes meet was 4 oral rounds instead of 5 due to weather. ** denotes shortened, remote meet due to COVID protocols (40 question written round and 4 oral rounds of 35 questions).

References

External links
Minnesota Public Radio

Student quiz competitions